State Road 76 (SR 76), also known and signed as Kanner Highway, is a  northeast-southwest (signed east–west) state highway connecting Port Mayaca on the shore of Lake Okeechobee at the intersection with US 98-441 (SR 700-SR 15) with Stuart on the shore of the St. Lucie River near the Atlantic Ocean and the Treasure Coast at an intersection with US 1 (SR 5).  It parallels the nearby St. Lucie Canal, a navigable waterway connecting the lake and the ocean.

Route description

West of Florida's Turnpike (SR 91) and Interstate 95 (SR 9), SR 76 crosses the woodland and wetlands typifying Florida northeast of Lake Okeechobee.  With the exception of Indiantown on the opposite (northern) side of St. Lucie Canal near the intersection of SR 76 and SR 710, very little human habitation exists along the southwestern  of SR 76.

Northeast of the two expressways, the human presence is more pronounced (a marina is located on the canal between the turnpike and I-95, for example) as the urbanization undergone by Florida's extreme southeastern counties has penetrated Martin County.

History
State Road 76 was formed by the former State Roads 85 and 109 in the 1945 renumbering.  SR 76's routing has been unchanged since 1945.

Major intersections

Related routes

County Road 76A

Until the mid-1990s, Florida Department of Transportation had State Road 76A signs along Pratt Whitney Road west of SR 76 in Tropical Park and Southwest 48th Street south of Martin Highway (SR 714) near Palm City (an eastward continuation of Pratt Whitney Road is the former SR 711, now County Road 711).

After FDOT removed its State Road signs from the alternate route, new County Road 76A signs lined the rural streets in their place.  The County Road 76A designation still applies to the former SR 76A.

County Road 722
At the same time that SR 76A signs were erected, Salerno Road between SR 76 and Dixie Highway (County Road A1A) in Port Salerno sported State Road 722 signs.  Like SR 76A to the west, Salerno Road lost its FDOT State Road designation and became County Road 722 in the mid-1990s; unlike the former SR 76A, the former SR 722 is not primarily a rural route, but a road making a direct connection between SR 76 and US 1 (East Federal Highway) in Coral Gardens, thus giving motorists an opportunity to shorten their drive from SR 76 to US 1 by ten miles.  Recently, the urbanization that is now occurring on the northeastern end of SR 76 is also occurring along the eastern half of CR 722 as construction of new residential developments continues.

References

076
076
Stuart, Florida